Pardon Mon Affaire, Too! (We Will All Meet in Paradise) is a French film, directed by Yves Robert, released in 1977.

The film is the immediate continuation of Pardon Mon Affaire, released the previous year.

Synopsis 

Having fortuitously discovered a photograph in which Marthe embraces someone unknown, clothed with a chequed jacket, Étienne Dorsay becomes jealous, and imagines various stratagems to identify the lover.

In the meantime, Étienne and his friends acquire a weekend house for a very low price.

As in the previous work, the film is largely narrated by the character Étienne, whose tone shifts with the reality of the images. 

The film contains a certain number of allusions to the films of Blake Edwards (the Pink Panther series).

Cast 
Jean Rochefort as Étienne Dorsay
Claude Brasseur as Daniel
Guy Bedos as Simon
Victor Lanoux as Bouly
Danièle Delorme as Marthe Dorsay
Marthe Villalonga as Mouchy Messina
Christophe Bourseiller as Lucien
Josiane Balasko as Josy 
Élisabeth Margoni as Daisy
Jenny Arasse as Bernadette 
Anne-Marie Blot as Marie-Ange
Pascale Reynaud as Delphine
Maïa Simon as Mme Chalamand 
Catherine Verlor as Stéphanie
Jean-Pierre Castaldi as The bully
Vania Vilers as Benoît 
Daniel Gélin as Bastien 
Gaby Sylvia as Marie-Christine Bosquet

Awards and nominations
 Nominations for the César Awards, 1978 :
"Nomination for the César Award for Best Film : Nous irons tous au paradis
 "Nomination for the César Award for "décor" : Jean-Pierre Kohut-Svelko, pour Nous irons tous au paradis 
 "Nomination for the César for scenario original or adapted : Jean-Loup Dabadie, pour Nous irons tous au paradis

References

External links 
 

1977 films
1970s French-language films
Films directed by Yves Robert
French romantic comedy films
Adultery in films
Films with screenplays by Jean-Loup Dabadie
Films scored by Vladimir Cosma
Midlife crisis films
1970s French films